Borrello is a comune and town in the province of Chieti in the Abruzzo region of Italy.

The highest waterfalls in the Apennines,  Cascate del Rio Verde, are located there.

Borrello's name derives from the Borrello family that had lordship there for a long time.

References

Cities and towns in Abruzzo